Merwan ha-Levi was one of the most prominent Jews of Narbonne in the second half of the 11th century.

He was a philanthropist, who devoted his time and fortune to that community. It seems that he was also in favor with the government, being thus enabled to check unfavorable measures against the Jews. He was the head of a family which produced several famous Jewish scholars, among whom were his son, Rabbi Isaac of Narbonne, and his grandson, Nasi Moses ben Joseph of Narbonne.

References
Henri Gross, Gallia Judaica, p. 412.

External links
Source

People from Narbonne
11th-century French Jews
Provençal Jews